Funqul  is a village in the Murzuq Desert in Murzuq District in southwest Libya. It is located east of Murzuk and just to the northeast of Zizau. To the east is Traghan.

References

Populated places in Murzuq District
Sahara